Slash was a punk rock-related fanzine published by Steve Samiof and Melanie Nissen in the United States from 1977 to 1980. The magazine was a large-format tabloid focused on the Los Angeles punk scene. The fanzine also gave birth to Slash Records, an important punk record label.

Description 
Slash regularly covered such L.A. bands as the Screamers, the Skulls, Nervous Gender, and X. It did not restrict itself to local acts; its first cover featured Dave Vanian of the Damned. It also featured articles and reviews on reggae, blues, and rockabilly, in doing so, introduced punk audiences to a wide range of then-unfamiliar musical genres.

Writers Claude "Kickboy Face" Bessy, Craig Lee, Richard Meltzer, Jeffrey Lee Pierce, Chris D., Allan MacDonell and Pleasant Gehman, and cartoonist Gary Panter were among the major contributors. Photo contributors included David Arnoff, Susan Carson, Kerry Colonna, Ed Colver, Diane Gamboa, Frank Gargani, Jenny Lens, Melanie Nissen, Donna Santisi, Ann Summa, Scott Lindgren, and coeditor Philomena Winstanley.

Closing 
Slash magazine folded in 1980, as many of the main principals involved were increasingly concentrating on other activities. Bob Biggs was more involved in running the label; many of the writers were concentrating on their own musical activities. In addition, there was a widespread perception that punk rock was dying, as movements such as post-punk, hardcore, and deathrock were emerging while many of the original Los Angeles punk bands (such as the Germs and the Weirdos) were breaking up, and in such a changing environment Slash had essentially served its purpose.

Issues

References

Music magazines published in the United States
Defunct magazines published in the United States
Magazines established in 1977
Magazines disestablished in 1980
Punk zines
Magazines published in Los Angeles